Giard may refer to:

People
 Giard (surname)

Places
 Giard Township, Clayton County, Iowa, township in Clayton County, Iowa, United States
 Giard, Iowa, unincorporated community in Clayton County, Iowa, United States
 Giard Point, a point forming the south side of the entrance to Perrier Bay, on the northwest coast of Anvers Island in the Palmer Archipelago in Antarctica